Trevor Baxendale is a writer. His first Doctor Who novel The Janus Conjunction was published by BBC Books in 1998. He has also written novels for Torchwood and Blake's 7, as well as short stories, comic strips and audio drama scripts.

Life and career

Bibliography

Novels

Doctor Who 
The Janus Conjunction (1998)
Coldheart (2000)
Eater of Wasps (2001)
Fear of the Dark (2002, republished 2013) 
The Deadstone Memorial (2004) 
Wishing Well (2007)
Prisoner of the Daleks (2009, republished 2014)
Deep Time (2015)

Torchwood 
 Something in the Water (2008)
 The Undertaker's Gift (2009)

Blake's 7 
 Criminal Intent (November 2014)

Audiobooks

Doctor Who 
Terror of the Master (Masterful Limited Edition) (2021)

Blake's 7 
Outlaw (2019)
The Rule of Death (forthcoming)

Game books 
 Doctor Who: War of the Robots (Decide your Destiny) (October 2007)
 Doctor Who: The Dragon King (Decide your Destiny) (March 2008)
 Doctor Who: Claws of the Macra (Decide you Destiny) (April 2010)
 Doctor Who: Terror Moon (Choose the Future) (October 2016)

For younger readers 
 Doctor Who - The Darksmith Legacy (book 6): The Game of Death (May 2009)
 Doctor Who: Heart of Stone (February 2011)

Adaptations 
 The Sarah Jane Adventures: Judoon Afternoon (based on the television script Prisoner of the Judoon by Phil Ford) (2010)
 The Sarah Jane Adventures: Painting Peril (based on the television script Mona Lisa's Revenge by Phil Ford) (2010)
 The Sarah Jane Adventures: The Haunted House (based on the television script The Eternity Trap by Phil Ford) (2010)
 The Sarah Jane Adventures: Blathereen Dream (based on the television script The Gift by Rupert Laight) (2010)
 Doctor Who: The Eleventh Hour (based on the television script by Steven Moffat) (2011)
 Doctor Who: The Time of Angels (based on the television script by Steven Moffat) (2011)
 Savitri's Tale and Other Heroic Stories (authorised adaptation from Anthony Horowitz's Myths and Legends) (2012)
 The Dragon's Tale and other Beastly Stories (authorised adaptation from Anthony Horowitz's Myths and Legends) (2012)

Short stories 
 The Queen of Eros (Doctor Who - Short Trips and Side Steps) (2000)
 Ash ((Doctor Who - Short Trips: A Universe of Terrors) (2003)
 Mortal Thoughts (Doctor Who - Short Trips: Life Science) (2004)
 The Ghost's Story (Doctor Who - Short Trips: Repercussions) (2004)
 Making History (Doctor Who - Short Trips: A Day in the Life) (2005)
 Mars (Doctor Who - Short Trips: The Solar System) (2005)
 Dr Cadabra (Doctor Who - Short Trips: The Ghosts of Christmas) (2007)
 Harm's Way (Torchwood Magazine issues 8, 9 & 10)) (August 2008)
 The Keep Killing Andy (Torchwood Magazine issue 19) (December 2009)
 Requiem (Torchwood Magazine - issue 25) (December 2010)
 Plant Life (Torchwood Yearbook) (2008)
 The Woman in the Sand (Beside the Seaside anthology) (2014)
 A Life Unwanted (forthcoming)
 Contagion (Blake's 7 - Heroes) (2017)
 The Pythagoras Problem (Doctor Who - Star Tales) (2019)
 TBA - (The Blakes 7 Annual 1982) (forthcoming)

Audio dramas 
Doctor Who: The Dark Flame (2003)
Professor Bernice Summerfield and the Draconian Rage (2003)
Doctor Who: Something Inside (2005)
Highlander: The Lesson (April 2009)
Robin Hood: Friendly Fire (May 2009)
Blake's 7: Scimitar (November 2014)
Blake's 7: Funeral on Kalion (Crossfire Part 2) (January 2018)
Blake's 7: Refuge (Crossfire Part 3) (April 2018)
Blake's 7: Damage Control (Restoration Part 1) (January 2019)
Blake's 7: Hyperion (Restoration Part 2) (November 2019)
Blake's 7: Parasite (Restoration Part 3) (February 2020)
Blake's 7: Imperium (Restoration Part 3) (February 2020)
The Worlds of Blake's 7 - Avalon (Volume 1): Black Water (April 2021)

Comics 
 Doctor Who Adventures - BBC Magazines (64 issues between 2007-2012)
 The Time Sickness (The Official Doctor Who Annual 2009)
 The Vortex Code (The Official Doctor Who Annual 2010)
 The Grey Hole (The Official Doctor Who Annual 2011)
 Monster Hunt (Sarah Jane Adventures website 2009)
 Return of the Krulius (Sarah Jane Adventures website 2009)
 Defending Bannerman Road  (Sarah Jane Adventures website 2010)

Other work 
The Monster Hunt (Interactive game, audio story and comic - The Sarah Jane Adventures website) (2009)

References

External links
 Goodreads page on Trevor Baxendale
 Archived BBC interview from 2004
 Interview on The Hub fanzine

Living people
Writers from Liverpool
Writers of Doctor Who novels
Year of birth missing (living people)
Place of birth missing (living people)
English male novelists